The Royal Patriotic Society is a Swedish royal society founded in 1772 in Stockholm, Sweden, by royal charter of King Gustav III of Sweden, with the aim of improving Sweden's economy, particularly agriculture, mining and the textile industry.
The Swedish Royal Patriotic Society awards medals such as Medalj för bevarande av svenskt kulturarv (Eng. ”Medal for preservation of Swedish cultural heritage”), Medalj För betydande gärning (Eng. ”Medal for significant deed”), formerly named Medalj för långvarig gagnande verksamhet (Eng. ”Medal for long-term beneficial activity”), and Medalj för gagnerik gärning inom svenskt näringsliv (Eng. ”Medal for a useful deed in Swedish business”).
The Royal Patriotic Society’s medals are made in 18k gold.

External links
 Official website (English)
 The King presents the Royal Patriotic Society’s medals 2009

Organizations based in Sweden with royal patronage
1766 establishments in Sweden
1772 establishments in Sweden
Patriotic societies
Economy of Sweden
Learned societies of Sweden